Afrocerura cameroona is a moth in the family Notodontidae first described by George Thomas Bethune-Baker in 1927. It is found in Cameroon, the Democratic Republic of the Congo, Gabon and São Tomé & Principe (São Tomé).

The wingspan is about 60 mm. Both wings are shining snow white, with a few black markings. The forewings have a trace of an oblique interrupted black dash in the fold and a trace of a median interrupted line, visible as a small black costal mark. There is also a trace of another line in the cell, and a fair sized mark on the inner margin. There is a trace of two very short black costal dashes beyond the cell, followed by a black wedge-shaped costal mark. A bare trace of a black subterminal line is mainly noticeable by a fair sized black mark on the inner margin almost in the tornus. The hindwings are uniform white.

Subspecies
Afrocerura cameroona cameroona
Afrocerura cameroona thomensis (Talbot, 1929) (São Tomé)

References

Notodontidae
Moths described in 1927
Taxa named by George Thomas Bethune-Baker